This is a list of the candidates who ran for the Alberta Party in the 28th Alberta provincial election. The party nominated candidates in 38 of the 87 electoral districts.

Calgary area (11 of 28 seats)

Edmonton area (19 of 26 seats)

Remainder of Province (8 of 33 seats)

See also
Alberta Electoral Boundary Re-distribution, 2010

References

2012 Alberta general election